The Old Indiana County Courthouse is a former courthouse located in Indiana, Indiana County, Pennsylvania. The courthouse was built between 1869 and 1870 and designed by local architect James W. Drum. It was the second courthouse to serve the county, with the first demolished in 1868. The final cost of the project was $150,000. A dedication ceremony took place on December 19, 1870. Former Governor of Pennsylvania William F. Johnston spoke at the ceremony.

The architecture, done in the Second Empire Italianate style, is primarily red brick and stone. The roof was designed in the Mansard style. The courthouse features a gold leaf cupola clocktower with four faces.

The large clock in the cupola was the largest in the county at the time. It was manufactured by Howard Clock Company of Boston and Springfield, Ohio. The four faces were each  in diameter. The clock required winding once a week, a 15-minute process. Today the clock runs on a new digital style, that turns the hands on the faces of the clock.

A jail and sheriff's residence was constructed next door in 1879, with a bridge that connected it to the courthouse to transport prisoners. At least six individuals were hung in the court's jailyard, between 1882 and 1913.

On September 24, 1945, a picture of Indiana-native Jimmy Stewart in front of the courthouse was featured on the cover of Life magazine. John F. Kennedy gave a speech outside the courthouse on October 15, 1960 while campaigning during the presidential election. In the rafters above the court room, there is a painted "JFK". As to whether this was from JFK himself is unknown.

The courthouse held its final session on November 11, 1970. After being replaced by the newer building, the now "old" Courthouse fell into disuse and was scheduled for demolition. The county commissioners offered a restoration-lease agreement to interested parties. On January 3, 1972, the commissioners approved an agreement with the National Bank of the Commonwealth, who planned to renovate the building for administrative use. NBOC was required to spend $100,000 in restoration over the initial three-year lease period in order to be eligible for a 47-year extension. The bank agreed to pay $12,000 total in taxes and rent for use of the courthouse, including the jail next door when it was vacated.

Today, the entire bell tower is supported by scaffolding set up in the main court room of the building, due to the age of the building's supports. This area is not seen by visitors very often.

The courthouse was listed on the National Register of Historic Places on October 29, 1974. Currently the building serves as administrative offices for First Commonwealth Financial.

The courthouse is featured in the Miniature Railroad & Village at the Carnegie Science Center in Pittsburgh.

See also 
 National Register of Historic Places listings in Indiana County, Pennsylvania
 List of state and county courthouses in Pennsylvania

References
Busovicki, John F. Indiana County. Arcadia Publishing, 2003. 

County courthouses in Pennsylvania
Indiana, Pennsylvania
Buildings and structures in Indiana County, Pennsylvania
Government buildings completed in 1870
Courthouses on the National Register of Historic Places in Pennsylvania
National Register of Historic Places in Indiana County, Pennsylvania
Clock towers in Pennsylvania
Second Empire architecture in Pennsylvania
Individually listed contributing properties to historic districts on the National Register in Pennsylvania